The Perdrix Formation is a geologic formation of Late Devonian (Frasnian) age in the Western Canada Sedimentary Basin. It  named for Roche à Perdrix in Jasper National Park, Alberta, by P.E. Raymond in 1930. It includes fossils of marine animals.

Lithology
The Perdrix Formation was deposited in a marine basin and consists primarily of black, bituminous shales. The upper portion includes nodules and thin nodular beds of argillaceous limestone that increase in frequency upwards and laterally toward the reefs of the Cairn Formation.

Thickness and Distribution
The Perdrix Formation is present as outcrops in the front and main ranges of the Canadian Rockies from the Kakwa Lakes area in northeastern British Columbia to the Ram River area of Alberta. It is also recognized in the subsurface immediately adjacent to the mountain front.

Relationship to Other Units
The Perdrix Formation overlies the Maligne Formation or, where the Maligne is absent, the Flume Formation. It is conformably overlain by the Mount Hawk Formation and the contact is gradational. Laterally it interfingers with the Peechee Formation and the reefs of the Cairn Formation.

Paleontology
Tentaculids are common throughout the Perdrix Formation, and brachiopods and pelecypods are present in the more limestone-rich portions.

See also

 List of fossiliferous stratigraphic units in Alberta

References

 

Devonian Alberta
Stratigraphy of Alberta
Devonian southern paleotropical deposits
Frasnian Stage
Geologic formations of Alberta
Western Canadian Sedimentary Basin
Fossiliferous stratigraphic units of North America
Paleontology in Alberta